Georgia Vasilopoulou (born 13 November 2001) is a Greek synchronized swimmer. She would have competed in the 2020 Summer Olympics, but the Greek team was disqualified due to a swimmer testing positive for COVID-19.

References

2001 births
Living people
Greek synchronized swimmers
21st-century Greek women